Lufu is a type of fermented bean curd from Yunnan Province in Southwest China. It is colored reddish yellow, it has a soft texture, and it has a savory flavor. It is used as a condiment for kăo ĕrkuāi or made into a sauce for Yunnan-style barbecue or stinky tofu.

See also
Fermented bean curd
Stinky tofu

References

Yunnan cuisine
Chinese condiments
Fermented soy-based foods
Tofu condiments